Florida's 7th congressional district is a congressional district in the north central portion of the U.S. state of Florida.

From 2003 to 2013, the district consisted of the suburban area between Orlando and Daytona Beach and included St. Augustine. The district included all of Flagler and St. Johns Counties; a very small portion of eastern Putnam County; parts of Volusia County, including portions of DeLand, Deltona, Ormond Beach, and Daytona Beach; much of western Seminole County; and a small, predominantly suburban portion of Orange County.

Following court-ordered redistricting in 2015, the district included all of Seminole County and northern Orange County, including much of downtown and northern Orlando and the cities of Maitland and Winter Park. The district is also home to the University of Central Florida, the state's largest university by student population in 2022-2023.

Following redistricting in 2022 based on the 2020 United States census, the 7th still includes all of Seminole County, as well as the southern half of Volusia County.

The district is currently represented in the U.S. Congress by Rep. Cory Mills.

Statewide election results

Presidential
Results from previous presidential elections

Non-presidential
Results from previous non-presidential statewide elections

List of representatives

Electoral history

2002

2004

2006

2008

2010

2012

2014

2016

2018

2020

2022

References 

 Congressional Biographical Directory of the United States 1774–present

External links
Rep. John Mica's official House or Representatives website

07
1953 establishments in Florida